Marius and Jeannette is a 1997 French film directed by Robert Guédiguian. It won the Louis Delluc Prize and the César Award for Best Actress, and received César nominations for Best Film, Best Director, Best Supporting Actor, Best Supporting Actress, Most Promising Actress and Best Writing. It was screened in the Un Certain Regard section at the 1997 Cannes Film Festival.

Plot
Marius and Jeannette live in the same working-class apartment complex in Marseille, in close proximity to their neighbors. The lame Marius is a security guard at an abandoned cement works, and since the company has gone out of business and the plant will soon be demolished, he is squatting in order to save money. Jeannette is a single mother raising her two children on her own on a meagre supermarket checkout operator salary. They meet when Jeannette tries to steal two cans of paint from the cement lot, and Marius catches her and tries to chase her. The following day Marius comes to her door to apologize and brings her the two cans of paint. A relationship soon develops between them, but as both have been wounded by marital difficulties and life in general, they are hesitant to become committed. It does not help that Jeannette's romantic fantasy notions are different from Marius' practical ideas. The two must learn how to love again in order for their relationship to blossom.

Cast
 Ariane Ascaride as Jeannette
 Gérard Meylan as Marius
 Pascale Roberts as Caroline
 Jacques Boudet as Justin
 Frédérique Bonnal as Monique
 Jean-Pierre Darroussin as Dédé
 Laetitia Pesenti as Magali, Jeannette's Daughter
 Miloud Nacer as Malek, Jeannette's son
 Pierre Banderet as Monsieur Ebrard

Awards and nominations
 Butaca Awards (Spain)
 Nominated: Best Art House Film
 César Awards (France)
 Won: Best Actress – Leading Role (Ariane Ascaride)
 Nominated: Best Director (Robert Guédiguian)
 Nominated: Best Film
 Nominated: Best Actor – Supporting Role (Jean-Pierre Darroussin)
 Nominated: Best Actress – Supporting Role (Pascale Roberts)
 Nominated: Best Writing (Robert Guédiguian and Jean-Louis Milesi)
 Nominated: Most Promising Actress (Laetitia Pesenti)
 Goya Awards (Spain)
 Nominated: Best European Film
 Lumières Award (France)
 Won: Best Film
 Sant Jordi Awards (Spain)
 Won: Best Foreign Actress (Ariane Ascaride)
 Won: Louis Delluc Prize

References

External links
 
 

1997 films
French romantic comedy-drama films
1990s French-language films
Films featuring a Best Actress César Award-winning performance
Films directed by Robert Guédiguian
Films set in Marseille
Best Film Lumières Award winners
Louis Delluc Prize winners